Patrick Tufts is a computer scientist and inventor. He created Alexa Internet's collaborative filter for creating related web site recommendations and later, one of Amazon.com's most successful product recommendation systems.

References

External links
Patrick Tufts's website

American computer scientists
Year of birth missing (living people)
Living people